Trattenbach is a village in Austria, situated in Lower Austria. It is in the industrial part (Industrieviertel) of Lower Austria.

From 1920 to 1922, the philosopher Ludwig Wittgenstein was an elementary teacher at the school in Trattenbach.

Population

Economy
There are 25 companies, 19 in 1991. 269 people are employed. The activity rate in 2001 was 44.96%.

References

Cities and towns in Neunkirchen District, Austria